Wat Khung Taphao (literally Temple of the bend of sailing ship watercourse) is a Buddhist temple (wat) is an ancient monastery located in Ban Khung Taphao, Mueang Uttaradit District of Uttaradit Province in Northern Thailand, near Khung Taphao intersection on national highway route number 11. This temple is in under control of the Maha Nikaya, comprising one of nine important local temples. In the year 2018, There are 20 monks and 3 novices that The Most Ven.Phra Ajahn Somchai jirapunno is the leader and to be abbot of Wat Khung Taphao and have Ven. Dr. Phramaha Tevaprapas Makklay is the Deputy Abbot.

This temple is well known that it is oldest in Kung Taphao sub-district that include Buddha's relics and two Buddha images Phra Buddha Suwannaphetar and Phra Buddha Sukosamrit From the evidence, it shows that these two Buddha images are two of nine of the most important Buddha image in Uttaradit.

Wat Khung Taphao was established in the era of the Thonburi Kingdom (1768–1782), and is still an important active temple in the Ban Khung Taphao region.

History 

Wat Khung Taphao is an ancient temple was established by King of Thonburi since the time of the Thonburi Kingdom, year of the Tiger 1771 and Buddhists arrived sometime in the early 18th century.

That was the year when the King of Thonburi  came to suppress Phra Fang faction (Chao Phra Fang Muang Sawangkaburi).  After that he spent time in here to organize in ministry of Buddhism in this area. According to the issue of  The Royal Chronicles of Ayutthaya (issue of Panjantanumas) in historical record of Thonburi Kingdom, it point out that Wat Khung Taphao is the only one temple in the areas of Muang Pichai and Muang Sawangkaburi to be established in that year.

In addition, when King of Thonburi government representatives came to record the names of the villages and landmarks in the area, the names for the village and temple were recorded incorrectly. The village name was changed from its original, "Ban Khung Sam Phao" to "Ban Khung Taphao", and the temple became "Wat Khung Taphao". These new names have remained the official ones to the present day.

King of Thonburi ordered the construction a hall for religious observances at Wat Khung Taphao as a symbol of victory of the normalcy it enjoyed during as such the Ayutthaya kingdom in the past and invited ecclesiastical dignitaries from the capital to teach monks and brought them back in line with the main teachings of Buddhism.

The old hall for religious observances of Wat Khung Taphao always was Local villagers were taught by the monks at the monastery until the government began supplying teachers in 1922.

When the river floods, it rises over the river banks and scours under the monastery foundations. Khung Taphao villagers decided to establish a new monastery farther away from the river in 1929. After the new monastery was built, the river changed its course and moved away from the monastery; this new land became monastery property.

Background of temple name 

When King of Thonburi government representatives came to record the names of the villages and landmarks in the area, the names for the village and temple were recorded incorrectly. The village name was changed from its original, "Ban Khung Sam Phao" to "Ban Khung Taphao", and the temple became "Wat Khung Taphao". These new names have remained the official ones to the present day.

Important within Wat Khung Taphao 

Nowadays, Wat Khung Taphao is not only the public resources of knowledge to encourage the education for ministry and people but also the center of community.  Buddhist Sunday Education center was contributed to support the community. Moreover, there are other organizations that located within Wat Khung Taphao and local training of Kung Taphao sub-district.

Surrounding of the temple, it includes chapel, pavilion at a temple and cubicle. Furthermore, others areas were separated to become specific zone which include herb garden and local museum. In these areas, it can make benefits for community because of providing knowledge and information.

There is an important Buddha image that is called “Phra Buddha Suwannaphetar” inside the building. The capacity of this building can be 100 people approximately. Moreover, this place can be used to do activities for monk and novice.

The main pavilion at a temple is used for religious ceremony on Buddhist days such as making merit, giving food to the monks and paying respect to Buddha. There are Buddha image which is called “Phra Buddha Sukosamrit” and Buddha's relics from India. As a result, it is wildly known as holy place.

On the second floor of this building is local museum where collect scripture of Buddhism and Thai Herbal Pharmacopoeia that are a significant resources of knowledge.

See also
List of Buddhist temples

References

External links
 Wat Khung Taphao 
 Wat Khung Taphao history  

1771 establishments in Thailand
Religious organizations established in 1771
Khung Taphao
18th-century Buddhist temples